The Oxford University Standard for Citation of Legal Authorities (OSCOLA) is a style guide that provides the modern method of legal citation in the United Kingdom; the style itself is also referred to as OSCOLA.  First developed by Peter Birks of the University of Oxford Faculty of Law, and now in its 4th edition (2012, Hart Publishing), it has been adopted by most law schools and many legal publishers in the United Kingdom.  An online supplement (developed for the third edition) is available for the citation of international legal cases, not covered in the main guide.

Cases

Cases are to be cited without periods in the names or the report names. If there is a neutral citation, which is generally the case after 2001 or 2002, cite it before the "best" report: the Law Reports (AC, QB, Ch etc.), or the WLR or the All ER.
 Carlill v Carbolic Smoke Ball Co [1893] 1 QB 256
 Transfield Shipping Inc v Mercator Shipping Inc (The Achilleas) [2008] UKHL 48, [2009] 1 AC 61

Use round brackets if the year is not needed to identify the report, but square brackets when it is. For example, the All England Reports are identified by year then volume, meaning you should use something such as "[2005] 1 All ER". 

When you cite something for a second time, an abbreviation can be used. In a footnote referring back to a particular page and another footnote, this would be,
 Carlill (n 12) 854
 The Achilleas (n 13) [12]
N.B. The foregoing parenthetical reference to a prior note or page may be disrupted if an editor inserts a new reference in the article before the reference of the parenthetical.

For European Union cases,
 Case 240/83 Procureur de la République v ADBHU [1985] ECR 531

For European Court of Human Rights cases,
 Omojudi v UK (2009) 51 EHRR 10

Journals and books
Journal articles, books etc. should be cited with the author's name as shown in the work being cited. Journal abbreviations are in roman, with no periods (full stops). If the journal does not have consecutive volume numbers, the year should be shown in square brackets, as in the second example. 
 Alison L Young, 'In Defence of Due Deference' (2009) 72 MLR 554
 Paul Craig, 'Theory, "Pure Theory" and Values in Public Law' [2005] PL 440

Books follow a similar pattern. Note the order is Author, Title (Edition, Publisher Year) page.
 Joseph Raz, The Authority of Law: Essays on Law and Morality (2nd edn, OUP 2009)

If a title and a subtitle have nothing in between, a colon should be used to separate them. A chapter in an edited book would be cited as follows.
 Justine Pila, 'The Value of Authorship in the Digital Environment' in William H Dutton and Paul W Jeffreys (eds), World Wide Research: Reshaping the Sciences and Humanities in the Century of Information (MIT Press 2000)

Legislation
The title of UK legislation should always be written in Roman with the year at the end. The section is abbreviated without any periods.
 Employment Rights Act 1996, s 86(1)(a)

EU legislation should be as follows.
 Council Directive 2001/29/EC of 22 May 2001 on the harmonisation of certain aspects of copyright and related rights in the information society [2001] OJ L167/10

Hansard and Parliamentary reports
 HC Deb 3 February 1977, vol 389, cols 973-76
 Joint Committee on Human Rights, Legislative Scrutiny: Equality Bill (second report); Digital Economy Bill (2009-10, HL 73, HC 425) 14-16

See also
 Citation of United Kingdom legislation
 The Bluebook: a Uniform System of Citation
 ALWD Guide to Legal Citation
 Case citation

References

Further reading

External links
OSCOLA website
Screencast introduction to OSCOLA
An online tutorial from Cardiff University

Law of the United Kingdom
Legal citation guides
Academic style guides